Lalremruata Arema (born 29 June 1994) is an Indian professional footballer who plays as a goalkeeper for Aizawl F.C. in the I-League.

Career 
He made his professional debut for the Aizawl against Mohun Bagan on 30 November 2019, He started and played full match he kept clean sheet as Aizawl drew 0–0.

Career statistics

References

1994 births
Living people
People from Aizawl
Indian footballers
Aizawl FC players  
Footballers from Mizoram
I-League players
Association football goalkeepers
Rangdajied United F.C. players